Nicholas Knyvett Lee (born 1954) is an English Anglican priest and author. He serves as associate vicar of Holy Trinity Brompton in the Diocese of London. With his wife, Sila, he is founder of the organisation Relationship Central, an umbrella organisation for The Marriage Course, The Marriage Preparation Course, The Parenting Children Course and The Parenting Teenagers Course. As of 2016, 7,000 separate courses were running in 127 countries, in 46 different languages.

Early life and career

Lee was born in 1954. He studied English at Trinity College, Cambridge. He proceeded to study theology and prepare for ordination in the Church of England at Cranmer Hall, Durham. He was ordained deacon in 1985 and priest in 1986, becoming curate, then associate vicar, of Holy Trinity Brompton, now one of the largest Anglican churches in the UK.

Lee met his wife, Sila, at the age of 18 at Swansea docks while waiting for a ferry to Ireland. They married in 1976 and have four children.

Relationship Central

The organisation Relationship Central started with The Marriage Course in 2005 – a series of seven sessions designed to help couples invest in their relationship and build a strong marriage. Lee, with his wife Sila, developed The Marriage Course for couples looking for practical support to strengthen their relationship. The course is designed to help couples build strong foundations, learn to communicate more effectively and resolve differences well. As of 2012, it has been translated into 40 languages and was running in 109 countries. As of 2016, more than 7,000 separate courses were running in 127 countries, in 46 different languages. The Marriage Course has been adopted by the British Army and an additional session on enforced separation (for example, as a result of operational deployment) was added by a military couple working in co-operation with Relationship Central.

The suite of courses has expanded to include: The Marriage Preparation Course, The Parenting Children Course, and The Parenting Teenagers Course.

Honours and awards

In February 2016, it was announced that Lee had been appointed a prebendary of St Paul's Cathedral, London. He was installed in March 2016 in a service at the cathedral.

See also

 Alpha course
 Nicky Gumbel
 Martyn Layzell
 St Paul's, Onslow Square

References

External links
 Holy Trinity Brompton website
 The Marriage Courses website

1954 births
20th-century Church of England clergy
20th-century English Anglican priests
21st-century Church of England clergy
21st-century English Anglican priests
Alumni of Trinity College, Cambridge
Alumni of Cranmer Hall, Durham
Anglican writers
English Charismatics
English evangelicals
Evangelical Anglican clergy
Evangelicalism in the Church of England
Holy Trinity Brompton people
Living people
Writers from London